Radio 1212 or Sender 11212 or Nachtsender 1212 was a black propaganda radio station operated from 1944 to 1945 by the Psychological Warfare Branch of the US Office of War Information (OWI) under the direction of CBS radio chief William S. Paley, who was based in London. Nachtsender 1212 broadcast from the Grand Duchy of Luxembourg using the former commercial radio facilities known as Radio Luxembourg, which had been occupied and then liberated from German control during World War II.

History of the station

Radio Luxembourg, a commercial, English-language station that broadcast to the United Kingdom, closed down on September 21, 1939, on the instructions of the government of the Grand Duchy to protect the neutrality of Luxembourg during World War II.

Era of "Lord Haw-Haw"
The Nazis also used the station to reach the British Isles. It featured the Irish presenter William Joyce, whose propaganda broadcasts became dubbed by disbelieving listeners in the UK as the stilted voice of "Lord Haw-Haw".

Era of OWI
On May 24, 1944, the Luxembourg government in exile in Washington, D.C., agreed that, following the liberation of the Grand Duchy, they would turn over the facilities of Radio Luxembourg to U.S. Army control. More specifically, this control would be given to SHAEF where the station would serve as "the voice of the Supreme Headquarters Allied Expeditionary Force" acting on behalf of America, Britain, France, Belgium and Luxembourg.

On September 10, 1944, the German armies fled Luxembourg following the Allied invasion on D-Day and the approach of a special task force of the American 12th Army. The Luxembourg transmitters were then turned over to SHAEF.

During the withdrawal some German soldiers had been ordered to dynamite the station, but a station engineer persuaded them to shoot holes in the transmitter tubes instead. When the US troops arrived, the engineer dug up a set of spare tubes which he had buried in the grounds of the station four years earlier.

Also using these facilities was the Psychological Warfare Branch of the United States Office of War Information (OWI) under the management of CBS radio chief William S. Paley. The OWI used the facility to create Nachtsender 1212, a black propaganda station that identified itself as broadcasting from within Nazi Germany.

The purpose of Nachtsender 1212 was to gain a loyal Nazi audience by broadcasting information favourable to the German interpretation of the War, but as the battle advanced against the borders of Germany itself, Nachtsender 1212 began to intersperse misleading and totally false information within its broadcasts. This included a fictitious story about a German city that rebelled against the Nazi regime, pretending to relay messages from the burgomaster asking for help. The station had a similar mission to the British-operated Soldatensender Calais, which attempted to undermine German military morale and provide misinformation under the cover of entertaining Germans. Nachtsender 1212 signed off the air by pretending that the Allies had captured this make-believe German station by overrunning it.

Era of transition
Following the occupation of Germany in May 1945, the future of Radio Luxembourg was debated in the United Kingdom. The BBC did not welcome the idea of renewed commercial competition if the facilities were turned back to commercial control. In conjunction with Winston Churchill, a plan was devised to redirect the station towards communist Eastern Europe and the Soviet Union by linking the Luxembourg transmitters via landline to BBC World Service studios in London. This plan fell apart when Churchill's Conservative Party lost to the Labour Party in the postwar British General Election on July 5, 1945.

For a time the Luxembourg transmitters remained under American control and were used both to relay programs for the Voice of America and originating programming under the call sign identifier of the "United Nations Station".

Radio Luxembourg was handed back to the Grand Duchy in November 1945.

See also
German People's Radio
Radio Luxembourg, or "208, your station of the stars" - 1951–1992.
Radio Luxembourg (disambiguation)

References
Hitler's Irish Voices: The Story of German Radio's Wartime Irish Service David O'Donoghue 

Radio stations in Luxembourg
World War II propaganda radio stations
United States government propaganda organizations
Radio stations established in 1944
Radio stations disestablished in 1945
Defunct mass media in Luxembourg